Gocha Kokoshvili is a Georgian former footballer who played as a defender

Career

In 1995, Kokoshvili signed for Russian fourth division side Torpedo-2 (Moscow) from Asmaral in the Russian second division.

In 1996, he signed for Portuguese third division club Olhanense from Næstved in the Danish top flight.

In 1997, he signed for Portuguese top flight team Belenenses before joining Hapoel Tzafririm Holon in Israel.

References

External links
 

1969 births
Living people
Footballers from Georgia (country)
FC Merani Tbilisi players
FC Dinamo Tbilisi players
FC Asmaral Moscow players
FC Torpedo Moscow players
Næstved Boldklub players
S.C. Olhanense players
C.F. Os Belenenses players
Hapoel Tzafririm Holon F.C. players
Maccabi Kiryat Gat F.C. players
Erovnuli Liga players
Russian First League players
Danish Superliga players
Primeira Liga players
Liga Leumit players
Israeli Premier League players
Association football defenders
Expatriate footballers in Russia
Expatriate men's footballers in Denmark
Expatriate footballers in Portugal
Expatriate footballers in Israel
Expatriate sportspeople from Georgia (country) in Russia
Expatriate sportspeople from Georgia (country) in Denmark
Expatriate sportspeople from Georgia (country) in Portugal
Expatriate sportspeople from Georgia (country) in Israel